Martin Griffin may refer to:
 Martin Griffin (Gaelic footballer), played for Donegal
 L. Martin Griffin, American environmentalist and conservationist
 Martin Ignatius Joseph Griffin, American Catholic journalist and historian

See also
 Marty Griffin (disambiguation)